Hail, Hail, the Gang's All Here is an American popular song first published in 1917. The lyrics, written by D. A. Esrom (pseudonym of Theodora Morse) to a tune composed by Arthur Sullivan for the 1879 comic opera The Pirates of Penzance, are:

 

The melody was originally part of "With Cat-Like Tread" in Act II of Pirates and echoes the Anvil Chorus from Giuseppe Verdi's opera Il Trovatore; W. S. Gilbert’s original lyrics set by Sullivan to the tune are:

It appears that the lyric "Hail, hail, the gang's all here" had unofficially been added to Sullivan's melody many years before 1917. It was referenced in American newspapers as a familiar song as early as 1898, sung at political and other gatherings. A Philadelphia Inquirer news item from April 1, 1898, for example, stated that during a raucous meeting, members of the Philadelphia Common Council loudly sang, "Hail, hail, the gang's all here, what the h--- do we care! What the h--- do we care!" Likewise, a Delaware state legislature session in March 1901 was disrupted when Democratic members loudly sang the song. The title line of the song is also quoted in the closing measures of the 1915 song "Alabama Jubilee". Also in 1915, the Ohio State University fight song Across the Field incorporated the title phrase as the penultimate lyric.

By the 1950s, the chorus of the song (with revised lyrics) had become popular in Irish and Scottish communities as being part of "The Celtic Song", sung by the fans of Glasgow Celtic in Scotland and later other teams. Glen Daly recorded an "official version" of "The Celtic Song" that is commonly played at Celtic Park prior to matches.

External resources
Sheet music with both verse and chorus
Lyrics with MIDI on nih.gov

References 

Compositions by Arthur Sullivan
1917 songs
Songs with lyrics by Theodora Morse